Sensuela is a 1973 Finnish drama film directed and written by Teuvo Tulio. The film is based on Tulio's 1946 film Rakkauden risti which itself was based on The Stationmaster, a short story written by Alexander Pushkin. Sensuela was Tulio's final film, and it was met with harsh criticism. Since its release, it has gained a reputation as a campy cult classic and has been called "the weirdest Finnish film ever made". Although the production was finished in 1972, it was not released until a year later and then opened only in selected theatres.

Premise
Sensuela is the story of Laila, a girl from Lapland, and Hans, a German soldier, who fall in love during the Continuation War.

Main cast 
Marianne Mardi as Laila Walk
Mauritz Åkerman as Hans Müller 
Ismo Saario as Pekka
Ossi Elstelä as Laila's father
Maria Pertamo as Greta Kujala

Release
Sensuela was the first film to be rated 18 by the Finnish Board of Film Classification.  After its initial release, Tulio prevented the film's subsequent distribution, and it only became available after his death in 2000.

See also

 The Hair (film)

References

External links
 
 

1973 films
1970s erotic drama films
Finnish erotic drama films
1970s Finnish-language films
English-language Finnish films
Films directed by Teuvo Tulio
Obscenity controversies in film
1973 drama films
Films based on works by Aleksandr Pushkin
1970s English-language films